Rellie Kaputin (born March 12, 1993) is a Papua New Guinean track and field athlete who specializes in the jumps. She competed at the 2020 Summer Olympics, in Women's long jump.

Life 
She studied at West Texas A&M University.

She currently holds the national records for the high jump, long jump, and triple jump events. In 2017, Kaputin competed at the 2017 World Championships in London, Great Britain jumping 5 meters 59 in the long jump qualification round without advancing to the final.

International competitions

References

External links 
 Rellie Kaputin, iaaf.org

External links

Living people
Papua New Guinean female athletes
1993 births
Athletes (track and field) at the 2018 Commonwealth Games
Commonwealth Games competitors for Papua New Guinea
People from East New Britain Province
Athletes (track and field) at the 2020 Summer Olympics
Olympic athletes of Papua New Guinea